The Quacks of Quedlinburg (Die Quacksalber von Quedlinburg), also known as Quacksalber, is a board game designed by Wolfgang Warsch that was released by Schmidt Spiele in 2018. After winning the Kennerspiel des Jahres (Spiel des Jahres Connoisseur-gamer Game of the Year) in 2018, an English version of the game was released by North Star Games.

Concept
Every year the city of Quedlinburg holds a festival, where the greatest Apothecaries and Quacksalbers (Quack doctors) compete against each other over several days to prove that they are the greatest potion brewer of the land.

Each year different ingredients are available for purchase in the markets, and each day a Fortune Teller will announce what strange occurrences will affect the competing Quacksalbers that day.

Gameplay

Quacksalber is a drafting game for 2–4 players. Players start with the same core ingredients represented by tokens held in a cloth bag. Players draw tokens from the bag until they either decide to stop, or their potion explodes - whichever comes first. After each round each Quacksalber will win prestige and/or money for the potions they brewed (those with potions that didn't explode get both). Money is used to purchase more ingredients that will assist them to brew even greater potion the following day.

The Quacksalber with the greatest amount of prestige (victory points) at the end of the game wins.

Five of the ingredients (Blue, Green, Purple, Red, and Yellow) have four options, which adds to the variety of gameplay. The Fortune Teller cards also specify a special rule that will be in effect for each day (round). These two elements result in each game having variable gameplay, which add to the game's replay value.

Reception
Quacksalber won a Spiel des Jahres award in 2018: Kennerspiel des Jahres (Connoisseur-gamer Game of the Year).

References

External links
 Official game website at Schmidt Spiele
 Official game website at North Star Games
 Official Rule Book in English (pdf free download)
 The Quacks of Quedlinburg at BoardGameGeek
 Review of Quacksalber by The Dice Tower

Board games
Spiel des Jahres winners
Kennerspiel des Jahres winners
German board games
Board games introduced in 2018